Estamos is a Mozambican non-profit organization. Headquartered in Lichinga, Niassa Province, it is principally involved in promoting HIV/AIDS awareness, nutrition and water sanitation practices.

References
 About Estamos

Medical and health organisations based in Mozambique
HIV/AIDS organizations